The Scottish Exchequer is a group of Directorates of the Scottish Government.  The Exchequer was formed in December 2010 with a re-organisation of the Scottish Government.

The Scottish Exchequer is responsible for the Scottish Budget, including taxation, spending and measuring performance.  The directorates within the Scottish Exchequer have responsibility for financial strategy, the fiscal framework between Scotland and the United Kingdom, public sector pay policy, capital borrowing, and engagement with UK Government bodies.

The current Director-General is Alyson Stafford.

Directorates of the Scottish Exchequer

Budget and Public Spending Directorate
Financial Strategy Directorate
Internal Audit and Assurance Directorate
Performance and Strategic Outcomes
 Taxation and Fiscal Sustainability

Cabinet Secretary and Ministers
Budget and Public Spending Directorate
Kate Forbes MSP, Cabinet Secretary for Finance and the Economy
Tom Arthur MSP, Minister for Public Finance, Planning and Community Wealth

References

Directorates of the Scottish Government
2010 establishments in Scotland
2010 in British politics